Tornero may refer to:

 "Tornerò" (Mihai Trăistariu song), 2006
 "Tornerò" (I Santo California song), 1974